Macrospace Ltd. was a British developer of mobile content headquartered in London, which mainly focused on Java ME-content. In June 2005, Macrospace merged with Sorrent Inc., to form Glu Mobile. Macrospace provided mobile games and mobile gaming products for network operators, service providers, handset manufacturers, media companies and intellectual property owners.

Overview 

The company developed a technology for Java web emulation. It was intended to emulate the full Java capabilities of many of the most popular mobile handsets, including rendering fonts and on-screen instructions.

Macrospace also offered online high score and in-game event billing services. Using the company's services, Cannons Tournament became the first commercially available multiplayer mobile game in Europe, allowing mobile gamers to play peer-to-peer games regardless of network or location.

References

Defunct video game companies of the United Kingdom
Mobile game companies
British companies disestablished in 2005
Video game companies disestablished in 2005